Adventures in Hollyhood is a reality TV show about the rap group Three 6 Mafia and its members Juicy J and DJ Paul. The show primarily takes place at a Hollywood Hills home that the pair resides in along with Hypnotize Minds artist Project Pat (who is also Juicy J's brother) and their personal assistants Computer and Big Triece. It premiered on April 5, 2007, on MTV.

Episodes

Guest appearances

Some of the recurring guests throughout the Hollyhood season are: Memphis rapper and H.C.P. artist Lil Wyte; the boys' newfound friend and former pianist for Dorothy Dandridge, Fern; and Three 6 Mafia's manager Rosenberg also referred to as Roses.

Other guests include:Lil JonHugh HefnerKristin CavallariJohn SingletonAshton KutcherJohnny KnoxvilleLil WyteScott SeditaJoel SchumacherFather Houston (Juicy J & Project Pat's dad)

References

External links
MTV's Adventures in Hollyhood Website
Celebrity Personal Assistant Jobs & Training
 

2007 American television series debuts
2007 American television series endings
2000s American reality television series
MTV original programming
Three 6 Mafia
Television shows set in Los Angeles